Jeanette Marie Sayers is an American poet and editor.

Biography 
Sayers earned an M.A. in Editorial Studies from Boston University. She is a proofreader at the Journal of Bone and Joint Surgery and a poetry editor for The Furnace Review. Her work has appeared in such journals as Red Owl, California Quarterly, and Beauty/Truth. Her poem "L,O,V,E & the Other 22" was featured on Poetry Daily.

Awards
2007: Belle Letters Contest, Virginia Arts of the Book Center

References

External links
Jeanette Marie Sayers

Year of birth missing (living people)
Living people
Boston University College of Communication alumni
American women poets
21st-century American women